Graeme McCreath Cunningham (28 December 1922 – 2018) was a Scottish amateur footballer, best remembered for his time as an outside forward in the Scottish League with Queen's Park. He also played non-League football for Romford and Hendon.

Career statistics

Honours 
Hendon
 Athenian League: 1955–56
Middlesex Senior Cup: 1955–56

References

1922 births
2018 deaths
Scottish footballers
Scottish Football League players
Queen's Park F.C. players
People from Largs
Romford F.C. players
Isthmian League players
Hendon F.C. players
Association football outside forwards
Scotland amateur international footballers